Cédric Morgan, pen name of Jean-Yves Quenouille (born 1943, Vannes (Morbihan) is a French writer. He has devoted himself to writing on the sidelines of a professional life in communication for global industrial groups (Rhône-Poulenc, Usinor, Pechiney). He lives today mainly in Brittany.

Publications 
2014: Une femme simple, éditions Grasset  -- Prix Breizh 2015 
2009: Kafka ramait le dimanche, 2009, Éditions Phébus—faux polar
2005: Oublier l'orage, éd. Phebus
2003: Le Bleu de la mer, éd. Phebus  — novel prize of the city of Carhaix, selection Prix Interallié
1999: Le Bonheur en douce, éd. Phebus — selection  Prix des Libraires
1995: L'Enfant perdu, éd. Phebus  — selections Renaudot, Femina and Interallié
1993 Les ailes du Tigre, éd. Phebus  
1991: Cet hiver-là, éd. Phebus

Cédric Morgan created and edited a poetry journal, Incendits, published between 1975 and 1995 with the help of the Centre National des Lettres, a magazine which published a number of contemporary poets, then little known, such as Hédi Kaddour and Roger Goffette

External links 
 Cédric Morgan on Babelio
 Cédric Morgan on L'Obs
 Une femme singulière on Le Telégramme
 Cédric Morgan on the site of éditions Phébus

20th-century French non-fiction writers
21st-century French non-fiction writers
Writers from Vannes
1943 births
Living people